Xanthophyllum penibukanense is a plant in the family Polygalaceae. It is named for the village of Penibukan in Malaysia's Sabah state.

Description
The smooth bark is grey or green. The flowers are creamy white to pale purplish, drying orange.

Distribution and habitat
Xanthophyllum penibukanense is endemic to Borneo. Its habitat is lowland mixed dipterocarp forests or lower montane forests from sea-level to  altitude.

References

penibukanense
Endemic flora of Borneo
Plants described in 1953